Mr. Rossi's Vacation (in Italian Le vacanze del signor Rossi) is a 1978 traditionally animated Italian feature film directed by Bruno Bozzetto. It is the third and last film featuring Mr. Rossi.

Plot
It's a story about Mr. Rossi and his dog who go on vacation and all the adventures they have, from being on a tyrannical farmer's farm and leading an animal revolt, to climbing the Andes, to heading to the beach and being serenaded by strange fish.

Cast

Additional Voices
 Carlo Bonomi

English voice actor
The film was dubbed into English in the 1980s.

Home media
In the United States, the English dub version was released on VHS by Family Home Entertainment in 1985.

See also
List of animated feature-length films
Mr. Rossi

External links
Official website

1978 films
Italian animated films
1970s Italian-language films
Films directed by Bruno Bozzetto
1978 animated films
1970s Italian films